Michael John Kaszycki (born February 27, 1956) is a Canadian former ice hockey player.

Biography
As a youth, Kaszycki played in the 1968 and 1969 Quebec International Pee-Wee Hockey Tournaments with the Toronto Christie minor ice hockey team.

He played major junior hockey with the Sault Ste. Marie Greyhounds, of the Ontario Major Junior Hockey League (today's OHL), winning the Eddie Powers Memorial Trophy as the league's scoring champion in his final junior season of 1975–76.

Kaszycki was drafted by the New York Islanders 32nd overall in the 1976 NHL Amateur Draft and by the New England Whalers 38th overall in the 1976 WHA Amateur Draft. He signed with the Islanders, playing with them, the Washington Capitals and the Toronto Maple Leafs. Kaszycki played 226 games over five seasons in the NHL, scoring 122 points.

During the 1981–82 AHL season, while playing for the New Brunswick Hawks, Kaszycki won three individual American Hockey League awards. Kaszycki was awarded the Les Cunningham Award as Most Valuable Player, the John B. Sollenberger Trophy as top scorer, and the Fred T. Hunt Memorial Award for sportsmanship and perseverance.

Career statistics

References

External links

Profile at hockeydraftcentral.com

1956 births
Canadian ice hockey centres
Canadian people of Ukrainian descent
Dallas Black Hawks players
EV Zug players
Fort Worth Texans players
Genève-Servette HC players
HC Ambrì-Piotta players
Ice hockey people from Ontario
Lausanne HC players
Living people
Moncton Golden Flames players
New Brunswick Hawks players
New England Whalers draft picks
New York Islanders draft picks
New York Islanders players
People from Milton, Ontario
Rochester Americans players
Sault Ste. Marie Greyhounds players
SCL Tigers players
St. Catharines Saints players
Toronto Maple Leafs players
Toronto Marlboros players
Washington Capitals players
Sportspeople from Milton, Ontario
Canadian expatriate ice hockey players in Switzerland